T.J. Bonner was the president of the National Border Patrol Council (NBPC) until March 8, 2011 when the delegates attending the NBPC convention elected a new president. This organization is a union that represents over 16,000 United States Border Patrol agents.

References 

Living people
Year of birth missing (living people)
United States Border Patrol agents
American trade union leaders
Place of birth missing (living people)